Robert Valberg (28 April 1884 – 15 October 1955) was an Austrian stage and film actor.

Selected filmography
 The Traitress (1911)
 Ivan Koschula (1914)
 The Silent Mill (1914)
 Laugh Bajazzo (1915)
 Money in the Streets (1922)
 The Tales of Hoffmann (1923)
 A Waltz by Strauss (1925)
 Colonel Redl (1925)
 The Arsonists of Europe (1926)
 Grandstand for General Staff (1926)
 The Girl Without a Homeland (1927)
 Huragan (1928)
 Our Emperor (1933)
 Frasquita (1934)
 The Emperor's Candlesticks (1936)
 Where the Lark Sings (1936)
 The Love of the Maharaja (1936)
 His Daughter is Called Peter (1936)
 Thank You, Madame (1936)
 Manja Valewska (1936)
 Romance (1936)
 The Charm of La Boheme (1937)
 Premiere (1937)
 Mirror of Life (1938)
 Linen from Ireland (1939)
 Hotel Sacher (1939)
 Seven Years Hard Luck (1940)
  Maria Theresa (1951)

Bibliography
 Kester, Bernadette. Film Front Weimar: Representations of the First World War in German films of the Weimar Period (1919-1933). Amsterdam University Press, 2003.

External links

1884 births
1955 deaths
Austrian male film actors
Male actors from Vienna
20th-century Austrian male actors